Remagine is the fourth studio album released by Dutch symphonic metal band After Forever. It was released on 8 September 2005 by Transmission Records and followed the 2004 concept album Invisible Circles. It was the band's first album with keyboardist Joost van den Broek, and their last released under Transmission Records.

Initially, the album was made available in three versions: a regular one, an SACD with three bonus songs in 5.1 surround sound and a special edition with a DVD containing a making-of documentary and a photo gallery. On 24 November 2015, Transmission Records reissued the album as a two-disc set containing the SACD bonus tracks, rare single edits, remixes and previously unreleased studio sessions. Although this edition included liner notes by former guitarist Sander Gommans, former lead singer Floor Jansen took to Instagram to denounce the label, claiming that she had never been made aware of the re-release.

Track listing

Personnel
After Forever
 Floor Jansen – vocals, soprano choir vocals
 Sander Gommans – electric and acoustic guitars, grunts, engineering, production
 Bas Maas – electric guitars, clean male vocals
 Luuk van Gerven – bass guitar
 Joost van den Broek – synthesizers, piano, orchestra and choir arrangements, engineering, production
 André Borgman – drums

Additional musicians
 Thomas Glöckner, Gregor Dierck, Benjamin Spillner – violins
 Swantje Tessmann, Marisy Stumpf, Thomas Rühl – violas
 Saskia Ogilvie, Jörn Kellerman – cellos
 Rannveig Sif Sigurdardottir – mezzo-soprano
 Amanda Somerville – alto, vocal coach, vocal producer
 Previn Moore – bass, tenor

Production
 Hans Pieters – engineering, production
 Andreas Grotenhoff, Alfred Meinstedt – engineering, production (piano)
 Sascha Paeth, Philip Colodetti – vocal production, engineering, mixing
 Miro, Olaf Reitmeier – engineering (orchestra)
 Peter van 't Riet – mastering

Charts

References

2005 albums
After Forever albums
Transmission (record label) albums